Kabulia is a genus of flowering plants belonging to the family Caryophyllaceae.

Its native range is Afghanistan.

Species:
 Kabulia akhtarii Bor & C.E.C.Fisch.

References

Caryophyllaceae
Caryophyllaceae genera